The Sailor's Song is an East German black-and-white film directed by Kurt Maetzig and Günter Reisch. It was released in 1958.

Plot
As the news of the October Revolution sweep through the world, the German High Seas Fleet's command, wary of a mutiny, decides to send all its ships to a suicide mission in the English Channel. Sailors Albin Köbis and Max Reichpietsch are sentenced to death for political activity. When the socialist sailor Steigert, a member of the firing detail, cannot bring himself to shoot them, he is arrested. On the cruiser Prince Heinrich, Steigert's friends Lenz, Lobke, Kasten and Bartuschek receive Vladimir Lenin's transmit to all of mankind calling for peace. Slowly, the sailors in Kiel — all members of different socialist parties: the Social Democrats, the Independent Socialists and the Spartakists — begin to realize the need for a revolution. The workers and the shipmates rebel against the officers, but the political gaps between them lead the uprising to a failure. In the end, many of the rebel sailors attend the foundation conference of the new Communist Party of Germany.

Cast
Hilmar Thate as Ludwig Bartuschek
Raimund Schelcher as August Lenz
Günther Simon as Erich Steigert
Ulrich Thein as Henne Lobke
Horst Kube as Jens Kasten
Stefan Lisewski as Jupp König
Jochen Thomas as Sebastian Huber
Vladimir Gulyaev as Grisha
Dieter Klamand as Kuddel König
Elfriede Née as Berta König
Ekkehard Schall as Schuckert
Adolf Peter Hoffmann as Gollwitz
Wolfgang Langhoff as attorney
Siegfried Weiß as Captain
Hans-Ulrich Lauffer as machine gunner
Hans-Hartmut Krüger as officer
Fred Delmare as sailor
Rolf Ripperger as sailor
Sabine Thalbach as lady

Production
The Sailor's Song was conceived in aftermath of the Socialist Unity Party's Conference on Cultural Affairs at October 1957, during which the East German establishment embraced a conservative line and ended the brief period of liberalization that begun after Nikita Khrushchev's Secret Speech. The Sailor's Song was commissioned shortly after, for the celebrations of the fortieth anniversary to the German Revolution.

The script writers Paul Wiens and Karl Georg Egel were instructed to present the 1918 Revolution in accordance with the official Soviet interpretation of history; Walter Ulbricht told that it failed due to the "opportunistic" Social Democrats and to the lack of a Marxist–Leninist party that would have led the workers "in the smashing of the capitalistic economical apparatus." The plot places emphasis on the Spartacus League, and culminated in the founding of the Communist Party of Germany.

Principal photography commenced on June 3, 1958. Directors Kurt Maetzig and Günter Reisch worked separately; the first's crew was responsible for the scenes involving the officers and the admirals, while the latter filmed those with the sailors and the crowds. The Sailor's Song was the greatest project undertaken by DEFA up to that time, and was larger in scale even than Ernst Thälmann. 15,000 workers, soldiers and People's policemen were used as extras during the filming. Since Kiel, the city in which the revolution took place, was located in West Germany, the directors used sets that were constructed in Goerlitz, Warnemünde and Rostock.

Reception
In 1959, Maetzig won East Germany's National Prize, 2nd degree, for his work on the film, as well as a special Peace Prize at the 1st Moscow International Film Festival.

DEFA Studio's director Albert Wilkening wrote that no picture, except Ernst Thälmann, ever touched the people of East Germany as deeply as The Sailor's Song. The SED considered it as one of the country's greatest cinematic achievements, and this view was upheld until the German Reunification. Critics Miera and Antonin Liehm claimed that it was a "made for order" film that was "clumsy and heavy-handed".
A West German Film Lexicon cited it as "well designed, but obviously propagandistic."

References

External links
 

1958 films
1958 drama films
German drama films
East German films
1950s German-language films
German black-and-white films
Films directed by Kurt Maetzig
Films directed by Günter Reisch
World War I naval films
Films set in the Baltic Sea
Films set in 1917
Films set in 1918
Films set in 1919
Films about revolutions
German Revolution of 1918–1919
1950s German films